Transair Flight 810, a Boeing 737-200 converted freighter aircraft on a short cargo flight en route from Honolulu International Airport to Kahului Airport on the neighboring Hawaiian island of Maui, experienced mechanical difficulties and crashed shortly after takeoff in the early morning of July 2, 2021.

The twin-engined plane was owned and operated by Rhoades Aviation under the Transair trade name, and had a crew of two. Both Pratt & Whitney JT8D turbofans faltered shortly after takeoff. Unable to maintain altitude, the pilots  ditched off the coast of Oahu about 11 minutes into the flight.

The pair were rescued about an hour after the crash in a coordinated inter-agency response involving multiple aircraft and boats. Both were hospitalized for serious injuries and later released.

The Federal Aviation Administration and National Transportation Safety Board immediately began investigating. Transair voluntarily withdrew its four remaining 737s from service for a week-long internal review. Transair resumed flying their one operational 737-200 a week later, but had to cease 737 operations a week after that due to deficiencies identified by the FAA prior to the ditching.

Flight

On July 2, 2021, at 1:33 a.m. HST, the aircraft began its take-off from Daniel K. Inouye International Airport (HNL) just west of Honolulu on the southern coast of Oahu.

The tower controller offered an immediate return for landing, but the crew instead requested delay vectors to run a checklist. They continued on a southwest heading, away from the airport. At around 1:46 a.m., the crew reported that the second engine had overheated, and they could not maintain altitude.

After turning back toward Honolulu, the aircraft continued to lose altitude, so the controller issued a low-altitude alert and asked if they wanted to go to the closer Kalaeloa Airport instead. "We'd like the closest airport runway, please" was one of the last transmissions recorded from the aircraft. The plane went down on the water of Māmala Bay about  short of Kalaeloa Airport.

Emergency response
A United States Coast Guard helicopter rescued one pilot and an Aircraft Rescue and Fire Fighting (ARFF) boat rescued the other. They were the only two people aboard. The 58-year-old survivor was hospitalized in critical condition; the 50-year-old survivor had a head injury and multiple lacerations and was hospitalized in serious condition. Both men were released from the hospital within a few days.

Rescue coordination
U.S. Coast Guard Joint Rescue Coordination Center Honolulu watchstanders received a report from Honolulu Air Traffic Control of a downed Boeing 737 offshore. In response, the Coast Guard issued a notice to mariners, launched a Eurocopter MH-65 Dolphin helicopter and HC-130 Hercules airplane from Coast Guard Air Station Barbers Point (co-located at the Kalaeloa Airport), sent out a 45-foot Response Boat – Medium crew, and diverted the cutter Joseph Gerczak. In addition to the Coast Guard, multiple other agencies deployed, including Emergency Medical Services. The Hawaii Department of Transportation’s ARFF boat based at the Honolulu International Airport also responded and took approximately 30 to 40 minutes to get to the scene after navigating through a mile-wide debris field. A Coast Guard press release quoted a watchstander saying, "Our crews often train closely with our counterparts... That training paid off and we were able to quickly deploy response assets to the scene and recover the two people aboard the aircraft."

On scene
Around 2:30 a.m., the Coast Guard helicopter located a fuel slick and wreckage. The helicopter crew radioed to the same tower controller who last spoke to Flight 810 about 45 minutes earlier, "We do have an aircraft in the water. We're currently overhead [the] debris field", then called a few minutes later to report, "We have zero, two souls in sight in the water." The controller responded: "Okay, so you have both guys, both souls in sight?" to which they replied, "Both souls in sight, yes, sir."

Both pilots had escaped through the cockpit windows. The helicopter crew planned to rescue the survivor already in the water first but changed that plan when the tail section rapidly sank, leaving the other survivor struggling to swim. The aircrew lowered a rescue swimmer, who put the survivor in the rescue strop, and they were both lifted on board the helicopter. That survivor was reported to be at the point of exhaustion and not fully responsive when he was assessed on board the helicopter.

The helicopter then brought the rescue swimmer to assist the other survivor. He was lifted on board the ARFF rescue boat, and later transferred to an ambulance on shore when the boat returned to the airport in Honolulu. The survivor recovered first was flown directly to the hospital once the helicopter crew recovered its rescue swimmer.

Aircraft 

The aircraft involved was a 45-year-old first-generation Boeing 737-200. From 1968 to 1988, Boeing built 1,095 of the 737-200 type, but by 2021, fewer than 60 were still flying worldwide. Scheduled passenger service using 737-200s largely ended in 2008 with the closure of Aloha Airlines (also based in Honolulu) but a few remained in passenger service through 2020.

This 737-275C Adv. combi aircraft was built for Pacific Western Airlines, delivered on October 10, 1975, and originally registered in Canada as C-GDPW. The aircraft was eventually taken out of passenger service, and later converted to a full freighter. In 1999 the converted airframe was re-registered to Transmile as 9M-PML in Malaysia until it was then re-registered by Transair in the U.S. as N810TA in 2014. It was one of five Boeing 737s in Rhoades Aviation Inc's Transair fleet.

Engines

First-generation 737s were powered by two Pratt & Whitney JT8D-9A engines, originally designed for the Boeing 727 around 1960. Pratt & Whitney produced more than 14,000 of these engines before regular production ended in 1985. The company continued actively supplying parts and overhauling engines through 2021 when roughly 2,000 were still in use. Mainline airline use of the JT8D continued until 2020 when Delta Airlines retired its McDonnell Douglas MD-88 fleet early due to the COVID-19 pandemic.

The FAA's Service Difficulty Reports database shows the aircraft involved, N810TA, experienced #1 (left) engine failure on takeoff twice in recent years, but with different engines each time. In a 2018 failure, the engine had accumulated 23,657 hours total time and 35,753 total cycles, while in a 2019 failure the engine had 71,706 total hours and 67,194 total cycles.

Investigation 

The following day, USCGC Joseph Gerczak completed collection of a small amount of incidental flotsam from the debris field to aid in the investigation. The NTSB examined the retrieved items, described as mostly general cargo.

In an initial statement, the Federal Aviation Administration (FAA) said, "The pilots had reported engine trouble and were attempting to return to Honolulu when they were forced to land the aircraft in the water... The FAA and National Transportation Safety Board will investigate." The FAA would not comment on its current investigation, but a local investigative reporter for KHON-TV found more than a dozen FAA enforcement actions against Rhoades Aviation and Trans Executive Airlines of Hawaii (doing business as Transair), with fines that totaled over $200,000 over 25 years. A company representative declined to comment because they are a party to the ongoing NTSB investigation, but a former FAA Chief Counsel published critical commentary on the reporting, cautioning against drawing premature conclusions from potentially unrelated historical enforcement actions.

"Transair has voluntarily chosen not to operate our Boeing 737 cargo aircraft temporarily while we assess the situation and continue to cooperate with federal authorities in their investigation", a Transair spokesman said in a statement the following day. Transair has a contract to carry mail between the Hawaiian Islands, but the United States Postal Service said no mail was aboard this flight. They had made alternate arrangements after Transair grounded its 737s. Transair resumed 737-200 operations a week later. But in less than a week, Rhoades Aviation lost its FAA inspection authorization at midnight on July 15, after failing to ask for reconsideration of a June 13 notice of deficiencies identified during an ongoing FAA investigation that began in 2020. This effectively grounded Rhoades's fleet of 737-200s, which only included one remaining operational aircraft at the time. The FAA said the grounding was not a direct result of the ditching.

The National Transportation Safety Board (NTSB) originally announced it was sending seven investigators immediately after the ditching, but updated that to say they were deploying a relatively large ten-investigator team to Oahu. Two investigators arrived later that day and began on-scene coordination, and the rest arrived by the next day. Team specialties included air traffic control, systems, maintenance records, human performance, operations, powerplants, and wreckage recovery.

The NTSB also announced that the manufacturers of the airframe and the engines, Boeing and Pratt & Whitney respectively, would be among the parties to the investigation. The NTSB stated, "In general terms, NTSB investigators develop factual information in three areas: the people involved in an accident, the equipment involved in the accident and the environment in which the accident occurred."

NTSB met with the parties to the investigation the following day, and said it would use side-scan sonar to locate and evaluate the wreckage prior to attempting to recover the "black box" flight recorders. The wreckage was located the following week at depths between —below the depth where human divers could safely recover the flight recorders per the NTSB.

The NTSB also sampled fuel from another aircraft and found no anomalies. By the end of the following week, the on-site "go-team" had completed collection of the perishable evidence, including interviews of more than a dozen key personnel, and returned home, but the flight recorders remained with the wreckage at the bottom of the sea.

Photos from a remotely controlled SEAMOR Marine Chinook underwater vehicle showed that the fuselage broke ahead of the wing, with the nose section separated from the center section, but the inboard sections of both wings were still attached to the fuselage wing carry-through.

On May 25, 2022, citing numerous safety violations found during its investigation, the FAA announced that it was revoking the airline's air operator's certificate. Among the cited violations were 33 flights undertaken with engines that were not airworthy. Rhoades was given until June 8 to appeal the agency's decision.

On December 20, the NTSB released their investigation docket on the accident.

Recovery 

The NTSB coordinated with the insurance company for Transair to begin an underwater recovery effort. Both engines, both fuselage sections, and cargo, were expected to be recovered, in an operation that was expected to begin on or about October 9, and last 10–14 days. A research vessel, RV Bold Horizon, with a 7,000 lb. remotely operated underwater vehicle (ROV) was used to raise the engines and rig each fuselage section for hoisting to the surface by a derrick barge Salta Verde equipped with a crane. The recovery is somewhat unusual in that the aircraft did not break up into small pieces. On November 2, the NTSB recovered both flight recorders as well as the aircraft's fuselage and engines.

See also
 List of airplane ditchings

Notes

References

External links

 
 NTSB investigation docket

2021 in Hawaii
Aviation accidents and incidents in the United States in 2021
July 2021 events in the United States
Accidents and incidents involving the Boeing 737 Original
Accidents and incidents involving cargo aircraft
Aviation accidents and incidents in Hawaii
Airliner accidents and incidents involving ditching
Airliner accidents and incidents caused by engine failure